This is a list of towns and villages in the Ghouta region of Rif Dimashq.

Eastern Ghouta 
Markaz Rif Dimashq District
 Hizzah
 Saqba
 Hawsh al-Sultan
 Shabaa
 Zabdin
 Beit Sawa
 Sahba
 Saqba
 Zamalka 
 Deir al-Asafir
 Al-Malihah 
 Kafr Batna 
 Jisrin
 Irbin
 Jaramana
 Ein Tarma
 Hamouriyah 
 Harasta
 Beit Sahm
 Hutaytet al-Turkman

Douma District  
 Dahiyat al-Assad
 Mesraba
 Madira
 Aqraba
 Douma 
 Al-Bahariyah
 Otaybah

Western Ghouta
Damascus Governorate (No longer considered as parts of Ghouta, rather as districts of Damascus)
 Mazzeh
 Kafr Souseh
 Dummar

Markaz Rif Dimashq
 Babbila
 Deir Ali
 Al-Sabinah
 Sayyidah Zaynab

Darayya District
 Ashrafiyat Sahnaya
 Darayya
 Muadamiyat al-Sham
 Sahnaya

Qudsaya District
 Al-Hamah

References

Rif Dimashq Governorate
Populated places in Rif Dimashq Governorate